Óliver Torres Muñoz (born 10 November 1994) is a Spanish professional footballer who plays for Sevilla as a central midfielder or an attacking midfielder.

After starting out at Atlético Madrid he went on spend several years in Portugal with Porto since first joining on loan in 2014, winning the Primeira Liga in the 2017–18 season. In July 2019, he signed with Sevilla.

Torres won 43 caps for Spain across all youth levels and scored three goals.

Club career

Atlético Madrid

Born in Navalmoral de la Mata, Cáceres, Extremadura, Torres joined Atlético Madrid in the summer of 2008 at age 13. He spent four years progressing through the youth ranks before being introduced to the first team by manager Diego Simeone.

In late April 2012, despite not yet having featured for the club's reserves, Torres was called up to the main squad for a La Liga game against Real Betis. On 19 August, in the 2012–13 season opener, he made his professional debut, coming on as a substitute for Adrián López in the 64th minute of the 1–1 away draw with Levante UD.

Torres made his first appearance in the UEFA Champions League on 1 October 2013 at the age of 18 years and 10 months, replacing the injured Raúl García for the last 12 minutes of a 2–1 away win over FC Porto in the group stage, becoming the Colchoneros fourth-youngest player to do so. On the 27th, he scored his first official goal with the main squad, netting after 12 seconds in an eventual 5–0 home rout of Betis.

On 31 January 2014, Atlético loaned Torres to fellow top-division side Villarreal CF until the end of the campaign, his opportunities having been disadvantaged by the club's acquisition of Diego. He said of the deal, "I will try to learn as much as I can in this period and continue growing as a footballer and person." He made his debut on 2 March, playing the second half of the 1–1 home draw against Betis, and started for the first time with his new team six days later, in a 2–0 loss at Granada CF.

Porto

On 3 July 2014, Torres was loaned to Porto in a season-long loan deal. He made his Primeira Liga debut on 15 August in a 2–0 victory over C.S. Marítimo at the Estádio do Dragão, playing the full 90 minutes. On 31 August he scored his first goal for his new team, opening a 3–0 home win against Moreirense F.C. in the 70th minute.

Torres was nominated for the 2014 Golden Boy Award. On 25 August 2016 he rejoined the Portuguese in another loan move, which was made permanent the following 9 February for a fee of €20 million.

Torres contributed 19 league games in 2017–18, helping to conquer the domestic league after a five-year wait. On 4 August 2018, he replaced André Pereira after 72 minutes in the 3–1 defeat of C.D. Aves in the Supertaça Cândido de Oliveira, providing the assist for Jesús Manuel Corona in the last goal.

Sevilla
On 15 July 2019, Torres signed a five-year contract with Sevilla FC. He finished his first year at the Ramón Sánchez Pizjuán Stadium with 37 competitive appearances, including five in the side's victorious run in the UEFA Europa League.

International career

Torres was a member of the Spanish team that won the 2012 UEFA European Under-19 Championship in Estonia. He played the entirety of the final on 15 July, in which the nation defeated Greece 1–0 in Tallinn.

Torres was part of the under-20 squad at the 2013 FIFA World Cup in Turkey, featuring in all five matches as the side reached the quarter-finals. On 5 September 2013 he made his debut for the under-21s, replacing Suso for the final nine minutes of a 6–2 away victory against Austria at the start of Euro 2015 qualifiers.

Torres scored his first goals on 14 November on his fifth under-21 cap, grabbing a brace in a 6–1 defeat of Bosnia and Herzegovina in Zenica also in the European Championship qualifying phase.

Career statistics
Club

HonoursAtlético MadridLa Liga: 2013–14
Copa del Rey: 2012–13
Supercopa de España runner-up: 2013
UEFA Champions League runner-up: 2013–14, 2015–16PortoPrimeira Liga: 2017–18
Supertaça Cândido de Oliveira: 2018SevillaUEFA Europa League: 2019–20Spain U19UEFA European Under-19 Championship: 2012Individual'
UEFA European Under-19 Championship Team of the Tournament: 2012

References

External links

1994 births
Living people
Sportspeople from the Province of Cáceres
Spanish footballers
Footballers from Extremadura
Association football midfielders
La Liga players
Segunda División B players
Atlético Madrid B players
Atlético Madrid footballers
Villarreal CF players
Sevilla FC players
Primeira Liga players
FC Porto players
UEFA Europa League winning players
Spain youth international footballers
Spain under-21 international footballers
Spanish expatriate footballers
Expatriate footballers in Portugal
Spanish expatriate sportspeople in Portugal